Winner is a 2003 Indian Tamil-language action comedy film written and directed by Sundar C. The film stars Prashanth and Kiran Rathod, while Vadivelu, Vijayakumar, M. N. Nambiar and Riyaz Khan played other important supporting roles. The film, which has music scored by Yuvan Shankar Raja and camera work handled by Prasad Murella, released on 27 September 2003 and became a commercial hit. This film is best known for Vadivelu's comedy.

Plot
Sakthi is studying Engineering in a college in Chennai, and he gets into quarrels every other day. Not able to withstand the threats from hooligans, his billionaire parents send him to his mother's village in Pollachi where his maternal grandfather Velayutham and grandmother Sivagami reside. Though his grandparents are rich and respected farmers, Sakthi has not met them due to a small dispute between his father and grandfather. In the village, an innocent third cousin of Shakthi, Kaipulla, lives with the old couple with hopes of becoming their heir. He has a small gang and roams around the village with his mates. Kaipulla is constantly challenged by Sakthi's distant relative body-builder Kattadurai, who is also a rich landlord. Sakthi visits his grandparents and decides to stay there for a month. A marriage of their relative is planned, and the whole family from all over Tamil Nadu assembles. Neelaveni, who accompanies her relatives, falls in love with Sakthi. Kattadurai is supposed to marry Neelaveni.

Many events follow. Kattadurai often clashes with Sakthi and gets beaten up. Amidst the wedding preparation, a group of former enemies including Vaira Kannan and Neelavani's aunt, along with Neelaveni's father, kidnap Neelaveni.  After a huge tussle, Sakthi brings back Neelaveni.

Cast
 
 Prashanth as Sakthi
 Kiran Rathod as Neelaveni
 Vadivelu as Kaipulla
 M. N. Nambiar as Velayutham
 Vijayakumar as Sathyamoorthy, Sakthi's father
 M. N. Rajam as Sivagami
 Riyaz Khan as Kattadurai
 Raj Kapoor as Vaira Kannan
 Jaya Murali as Dhanalakshmi, Sakthi's mother
 Prathap Singh as Santhanapandi, Neelaveni's father
 Vimalraj as Vaira Kannan's brother
 Anuradha as Neelaveni's aunt
 Santhana Bharathi as Neelaveni's uncle
 Crane Manohar as Kaipulla's sidekick
 Bonda Mani as Kaipulla's sidekick
 Muthukaalai as Kaipulla's sidekick
 Junior Balaiah as Kattadurai's uncle
 Vichu Viswanath as Kattadurai's cousin
 Singamuthu as Thief
 Halwa Vasu as Train Station Master
 Bharathi as Neelaveni's friend
 Thalapathy Dinesh as Neelaveni's bodyguard
 Vatsala Rajagopal as Neelaveni's grandmother
 Shanmugasundari as Neelaveni's grandmother
 Nirosha as Neelaveni's cousin
 Nellai Siva as Astrologer
 Kottai Perumal
 Chelladurai
 Soori as Kaipulla's henchman (uncredited)

Production
Actor Prashanth signed on to star in the film, being produced by R. Bhooma Ramachandran in late 2001, with Aarthi Aggarwal signed on the play the film's heroine. It was reported that she had impressed actress Khushbu with her performances in Telugu films and Kushboo thus recommended her to her film maker husband, Sundar C. However she was later replaced by Kiran Rathod and filming for project began as early as January 2002. The film was primarily shot in and around Chennai, Ilanji and Pollachi, while scenes showcasing a wedding at Kiran's house was shot at Vasan House, Chennai. Prashanth was briefly hospitalised after injuring himself filming an action scene for the film. Vadivelu got injured during a comedy scene at the beginning of the movie shoot.

Despite being completed by the end of 2002, the release of the film was held up after production issues and so the director Sundar C decided to prioritise his work on Kamal Haasan's Anbe Sivam.

Release
The film released on 27 September 2003 to positive reviews. A critic noted "It is a typical Sundar C. brand entertainer with comedy, stunts, romance and sentiment thrown in to make the product racy", concluding it was set to be a "box office winner". Another critic also noted "Vadivelu’s comedy is the highlight of the film. He has given a consistent performance in the film".

Post-release, the film's producer Ramachandran complained of the treatment he was given by Prashanth and his father during the making of the film. He claimed that the pair demanded extra salary and had initially insisted that the team cast Kareena Kapoor in the lead role. In 2010, the producer spoke of his bankruptcy and blamed Prashanth for his role in the losses he suffered.

Vadivelu's Association in the film was titled as 'Varuthapadatha Valibar Sangam', became very famous and it was modified to be used as the title for the 2013 Ponram and Sivakarthikeyan film as Varuthapadatha Valibar Sangam.

Soundtrack

After Unakkaga Ellam Unakkaga (1998) and Rishi (2000), Sundar C. and Yuvan Shankar Raja worked together for the third time for the music composition of this film. The soundtrack, released on 17 March 2003, features 6 tracks with lyrics penned by Pa. Vijay and Viveka.

References

External links
 

2003 films
Films scored by Yuvan Shankar Raja
Films directed by Sundar C.
2000s Tamil-language films
2003 action comedy films
2003 romantic comedy films
2000s masala films
Films shot in Chennai
Films shot in Pollachi
Indian action comedy films
Indian romantic comedy films